Billy Wright may refer to:

 Billy Wright (Australian footballer) (1900–1983), Australian footballer
 Billy Wright (basketball) (born 1974), American college basketball coach
 Billy Wright (boxer) (born 1964), American boxer, nicknamed "Bronco"
 Billy Wright (footballer, born 1900) (1917–?), English footballer with Bolton, Reading and Rouen
 Billy Wright (footballer, born 1924) (1924–1994), Wolverhampton Wanderers and England football captain
 Billy Wright (footballer, born 1931) (1931–2020), Blackpool, Leicester City, Newcastle football player
 Billy Wright (footballer, born 1958), Everton and Birmingham City centre-half
 Billy Wright (footballer, born 1962), New Zealand international footballer
 Billy Wright (football manager) (1903–1983), English football manager
 Billy Wright (loyalist) (1960–1997), Northern Irish loyalist paramilitary leader
 Billy Wright (musician) (1932–1991), blues singer
 Billy Pat Wright (born 1937), American Republican member of the Missouri House of Representatives

See also
 William Wright (disambiguation)